The Right Reverend Michael Bird (born 15 November 1957) is a retired Canadian Anglican bishop. From 2008 until 2018 he was the Bishop of Niagara in the Anglican Church of Canada.

Bird was born in Oakville, Ontario on 15 November 1957 and educated at the University of Toronto, he was ordained in 1984. He has held incumbencies at  Burin, Newfoundland; St Paul's, Dunnville;  St Cuthbert's, Oakville; and St Luke's, Burlington. He became coadjutor bishop of Niagara in 2007 and its diocesan a year later.

In accepting his new ministry, Bishop Michael invited the Diocese of Niagara into a process of discernment which helped to formulate a renewed vision for ministry. He was steadfast in his desire to lead the diocese in a missional, vision-shaped future in which parishioners sought to follow Christ passionately as partners with God and others promoting God’s mission in the world. During his episcopacy, Bird was a strong advocate for justice and inclusion in the life of the church and world.

In addition to his diocesan leadership, Bishop Bird was also involved in the Consultation of Anglican Bishops in Dialogue since its inception in 2011.

On 12 September 2017, he announced that he would step down on 1 June 2018.  An electoral synod to choose his successor was held Saturday, 3 March 2018.

References

1957 births
People from Oakville, Ontario
University of Toronto alumni
Anglican bishops of Niagara
21st-century Anglican Church of Canada bishops
Living people